Woodford is a surname originally referring to places located near a river crossing in a forest. The surname Woodforde is pronounced similarly. Notable people with these surnames include:

Woodford 
Adolphus Frederick Alexander Woodford (1821–1887), British historian of Freemasonry
Arthur B. Woodford (1861–1946), American economist, university professor, grammar school rector, and football coach
Field Marshal Sir Alexander George Woodford (1782–1870), senior British Army officer and colonial administrator
Charles Woodford (disambiguation), several people
George Woodford (1915–1966), English footballer with Norwich City and Southampton
Howard E. Woodford (1921–1945), United States Army soldier, Medal of Honor recipient
Jake Woodford (born 1996), American baseball player
James Woodford (bishop) (1820–1885), Bishop of Ely from 1873
James Woodford (1893–1976), English sculptor
Jeanne Woodford, American former prison officer, Executive Director of Death Penalty Focus
John Woodford several people
Kevin Woodford (born 1950), British TV chef and actor
Larry Woodford, member of the Ohio House of Representatives (2010)
Les Woodford (1897–1965), Australian rules footballer
Matthew Woodford (1738–1807), Archdeacon of Winchester 1795–1807
Michael Woodford (disambiguation), several people
Neil Woodford (born 1960), British fund manager
Nina Woodford, Swedish songwriter
Sir Ralph Woodford (1784–1828), Governor of Trinidad 1813–1828
Oswald Langdon Woodford (1827–1870), American Congregationalist minister, teacher, and politician
Rick Woodford (1948–2006), member of the Newfoundland and Labrador House of Assembly (1985–2003), mayor of Cormack
Robert Woodford (17th-century diarist) (1606–1654), English lawyer
Robert J. Woodford (born 1936), American expert on the Latter Day Saint movement
Stewart L. Woodford (1835–1913), American politician
William Woodford (politician) (1858–1944), Canadian politician from Newfoundland
William Woodford (1734–1780), American general

Edith Woodford-Grimes (also known as Dafo; 1887–1975), one of the earliest known English Wiccan
Sue Woodford-Hollick (born 1945), British businesswoman and campaigner
Eluned Woodford-Williams (1913–1984), British geriatrician

Woodforde 
Anna Maria Woodforde (1757–1830), English housekeeper and diarist
Christopher Woodforde (1907–1962), Anglican priest, Dean of Wells 1959–1962
James Woodforde (1740–1803), English author of The Diary of a Country Parson, published posthumously
Dr John Woodforde (1808–1866), early British settler of Adelaide, South Australia
Mark Woodforde (born 1965), Australian professional tennis player
Samuel Woodforde (1763–1817), English painter

Amy Woodforde-Finden (1860–1919), Chilean composer

See also
The Woodford baronets
Woodford (disambiguation)

English toponymic surnames